There were seven copper smelters built in the Copper Country in the Upper Peninsula of Michigan:

 Calumet and Hecla smelter - Operated by Calumet and Hecla Mining Company and located north of Hubbell on the shore of Torch Lake
 Detroit and Lake Superior Smelter - Near Hancock 
 Lac La Belle Smelter - In Lac La Belle - Structure was completed, but no furnaces were ever installed.  Later was converted by the Keweenaw Central Railroad to a locomotive shop.
 Michigan Smelter - Located west of Houghton near Cole's Creek on the Keweenaw waterway.
 Quincy Smelter - Located east of Hancock in Ripley on the Keweenaw Waterway
 Tamarack/Osceola Smelter - In Dollar Bay
 White Pine mine smelter - Was mostly closed in 1982 but continued to process copper and scrap material until 1984

See also
 Copper mining in Michigan
 List of Copper Country mines
 List of Copper Country mills

Notes

Buildings and structures in Houghton County, Michigan
Copper Country smelters
Buildings and structures in Keweenaw County, Michigan
Copper Country smelters